Wingin' It (originally titled Angel on Campus prior to its debut) is a Canadian teen sitcom which aired on Family. The series was produced by Temple Street Productions in association with Family. It stars Demetrius Joyette and Dylan Everett. This show included guest-stars from other Family Channel shows such as The Latest Buzz. It was announced that the series was renewed for a third season on June 13, 2011. Family announced that the series is not planned for a fourth season.

Plot 
Wingin' It is a family series about a friendship. One half of the friendship is Porter Jackson, a centuries-old angel-in-training (AIT) who has been sent to Earth to get his angel wings posing as a carefree sixteen-year-old student. The other half is Carl Montclaire, a fifteen-year-old typical high school kid who has been going through a run of bad luck. Little things seem to always be going wrong in Carl's life. For Porter to get his angel wings, he's been given the assignment of making Carl the most popular kid at Bennett High. In season 3, Jane knows that Porter is an angel-in-training and helps him through the various problems he has with his magic.

Cast and characters

Main 
Dylan Everett as Carl Montclaire – Porter's task of making Carl Montclaire the most popular student in school looks like a lost cause at first. Carl is not particularly popular and very unlucky. But with Porter's help he becomes more appreciated by winning a basketball tournament, starring in the school play and hosting his own radio show, among other things. Carl is interested in girls and in the first series he has a crush on the beautiful but unintelligent Brittany. But he never has proper feelings for her, whereas in the second series he has a much bigger crush on Jane, who was previously just his best friend, following their kiss in the school play featured in Drama-rama at the end of Season 1. At the end of the second series Carl figures out that Jane prefers Porter, and is very depressed for a while afterwards, when he admits to himself and to Jane that their relationship can't go anywhere. At the end of that episode, a rejected Carl is seen brooding over the future. He then shares a kiss with Denise in the final moments of that episode, and when the season resumes, he has returned to being only friends with Jane and being out with Denise, although that is strictly prohibited. This does not stop them, however, until Mildred Stern, comes down to investigate, after being tipped off by Denise's ex-boyfriend, Lex. In the third season his feelings for Jane return, she reciprocates, and they begin to date.
Demetrius Joyette as Porter Jackson – Porter Jackson is a few centuries old AIT that is also a bit of a troublemaker. In heaven he's a very powerful angel with infinite magic coursing through him as told by Dr. Cassabi in one of the episodes. He's naturally popular and a cool guy. Porter boasts that he could make any kid popular, but in Carl Montclaire, it looks like he may have met his match. He himself is a prankster and popular, up above. However, thanks to him Carl's popularity increases, although he has not yet become popular enough for Porter to be granted his angel wings. Despite helping Carl in his attempts to ask out Jane in season 2, it is revealed in Magical Kiss-Tery Tour that he also has affections for Jane, forcing Carl into a difficult decision. When the series resumes, there has thus far been no sign of the Porter-Jane relationship reappearing. In the episode "Live and Let Fly" Porter becomes a full angel but because he completed his assignment, he was forced to leave Carl.
Wayne Thomas Yorke as Dr. J. Bartholomew Cassabi – Posing as Bennett High's guidance counsellor, Dr Cassabi is actually an AIT advisor. He assists Porter and later Denise when things go wrong, which is regular.
Kendra Timmins as Denise Simmons (previously Dennis) – Dr. Cassabi's living raccoon puppet who acts as his helper and occasional spy. Dennis was actually a former AIT named Denise who accidentally trapped herself in the raccoon puppet back in the 15th century. Porter manages to release Denise from the raccoon puppet in season 2. Denise quickly becomes Porter's female counterpart – like Porter, she is a trouble maker who has a tendency to misuse her magic, and is very good at getting into trouble. Denise is also a good singer. She has affections for Carl which can be noticed throughout the season, although they are only returned at the end of season 2.1. When the season resumes Denise and Carl are dating, although this is complicated by the rules against angel-human relationships. Matt Ficner and Mike Petersen portray Denise as Dennis the raccoon. In the episode, "Live and Let Fly", Brittany becomes her angel assignment.
Brittany Adams as Jane Casey – Jane is the smartest kid in school and not self-conscious about it. She's always looking for a new club to join and leads many of them, including the school newspaper. She is pro-active and not only writes the school play in season one but also picks the cast and eventually stars in it herself. She and Carl have been best friends since kindergarten, and she and Brittany become friends in season 2.1. She is unaware of Carl's true feelings for her in season 2.1, and doesn't know that she is hurting his feelings when she kisses Porter in Magical Kiss-tery Tour. She only finds out afterwards, and feels guilty and slightly depressed about the romantic triangle. However, upon the resumption of the series, the Jane-Porter relationship does not rematerialise, and Carl has also got over his previous feelings for Jane. In the second-season finale she witnesses Porter performing magic, and Porter and Denise reveal to her that they are A.I.T's. She is shown to have developed feelings for Carl in 'Practical Romance'.
Brian Alexander White as Alejandro "Alex" Horatio P. Rodriguez – As Jane and Carl say, the only thing you can say about their Mexican, Swahili-speaking, Unicorn-loving friend is 'he's Alex'. He rarely has a major role in episodes and tends to be there for comedic value only, such as when he is Carl's gag man in 'Montclaire on the Air'.
Sebastian Hearn as Serge Delvecchio – Originally a bully to Carl, Serge becomes more like a friend, although he can turn it on and off. He is the best athlete at Bennett High, but he's not exactly the sharpest tool in the box. He speaks as himself in a third person. He is a useful pawn, and shows a slightly more emotional side in 'I Carlie' when he starts crushing on Carl's girl form, Carlie.
Hannah Lochner as Brittany Hanson – Brittany is popular for no apparent reason other than that she is beautiful. Although she aspires to be a famous singer, she is untalented in that area and is actually better suited to acting. She and Jane become friends in season 2.1. In the episode, "Live and Let Fly", she becomes Denise's angel assignment.
Jennifer Robertson as Angela Montclaire – As Carl's mom, she can be embarrassing and patronising but cares deeply for her son.
Jamie Bloch as Becky Montclaire – As Carl's sister, she claims that her job is to wind up Carl, although as her mum points out in "Basket Case", she does seem to work overtime.

Recurring 
Steven Morel as Principal Malone – Bennett High's fun but fair principal, he is a bit cheesy at times and plays the ukulele, he is also desperate to get a new car.
Jennifer Parsons as Mrs. Lennox – Bennett High's flighty English/Drama teacher. She finds out about the AI.Ts in 'School Spirit', but when the timeline was erased she returns to being clueless again.
Matt Baram as Mr. Dolby – Bennett High's nerdy and slightly eccentric Science teacher.
Eugene Clark as Coach Heinrich – Bennett High's high-strung and competitive Gym teacher.
Denis Akiyama as Mr. Nakamora – Bennett High's shifty Math teacher.
Pat McKenna as Mr. Telson – Bennett High's eternally angry History teacher who shouts at people for no good reason and apparently "Hates everyone equally".
Emma Gibbs as Melissa – Always looking to be included and always eager to please. She has feelings for Serge and starts dating him in the last episode of Season 3.
Naomi Snieckus as Mildred Stern – Heaven's uber strict bureaucrat.
Caitlyn Piotrowski and Katrina Mahoney as The Listern Sisters – Bennett High's resident spooky duo. They seldom speak and are a general mystery to the rest of the students; they even creep the angels out. In the episode, "Live and Let Fly", they are revealed to be angels watching over Porter, and stay after he leaves (presumably to watch over Denise.) Their creepy appearance is revealed to be a disguise, and they are actually pretty in their real state.

Production 
The series is produced by Temple Street Productions and BBC Worldwide Sales & Distribution in association with Family Channel.

Season One started filming in mid-2009 and ended in late October. A total of 13 twenty-five-minute episodes have been produced for series one. It was announced the second series would premiere on the Family Channel in January 2011.

The theme song is sung by Canadian band Stereos and features the main cast in the video. Principal Photography on the second season began filming on July 5, 2010 in North York, Ontario. The School used in the production was an actual school (Melody Road Public School) opened in 1952 and used for a couple of decades before being closed due to declining enrollment. The second series was divided into two parts, seasons 2.1 and 2.2. On July 31, 2011, Family accounted either 10 or 26 episodes in Season 3 and 10 episodes were eventually made. Family said that it would premiere on August 26, 2011, but got pushed back indefinitely due to season 2.2. An original press release states that new episodes would have started on September 24, 2012 but the third season was pushed back again. Season 3 is now airing in Canada. Season 3 started production in January 2012 and was broadcast in June 2012 on CBBC. Season 3 began airing on Family Channel in Canada in late February 2013.

Episodes

Series overview

Season 1 (2010)

Season 2 (2011–12)

Season 3 (2012)

Broadcast
Wingin' It premiered in 2010, when it was broadcast on the Family Channel in Canada. Family was the only channel to air it until Disney XD (Canada) started broadcasting it; it then began airing on Family Chrgd on June 1, 2011.  The third season has aired in the United Kingdom on CBBC, and started airing in Canada on March 3, 2012. In March 2013, the series began airing in the United States Mondays-Fridays at 7PM. It was also broadcast on TVB Pearl in Hong Kong, airing Mondays-Fridays at 5PM.

Internationally, it has appeared on:
 BBC Two (UK)
 CBBC (UK)
 Disney Channel (Italy)
 Nickelodeon (Flanders, Belgium)
 Nickelodeon (Germany)
 Nickelodeon (Netherlands)
 Gloob (Brazil)
 Teletoon+ (Poland)
 Starz Kids & Family (USA)
 Kidz TV (Turkey)
 SVT (Sweden)
 NRK Super (Norway)

References

External links
 

2010s Canadian high school television series
2010s Canadian teen sitcoms
2010 Canadian television series debuts
2013 Canadian television series endings
Family Channel (Canadian TV network) original programming
English-language television shows
Angels in television
Canadian fantasy television series
Television shows set in Toronto
Television shows filmed in Toronto
Canadian television shows featuring puppetry
Television series about raccoons
Television series about teenagers
Television series by Temple Street Productions